Reginald Gostelow (26 July 1900 – 2 August 1984) was an Australian cricketer. He played three first-class matches for New South Wales between 1920/21 and 1924/25.

See also
 List of New South Wales representative cricketers

References

External links
 

1900 births
1984 deaths
Australian cricketers
New South Wales cricketers
Cricketers from Sydney